α5IA (LS-193,268) is a nootropic drug invented in 2004 by a team working for Merck, Sharp and Dohme, which acts as a subtype-selective inverse agonist at the benzodiazepine binding site on the GABAA receptor. It binds to the α1, α2, α3 and α5 subtypes.

In Vivo Electrophysiology 

Recordings of local field potentials indicate that oral administration of α5IA increases the amplitude of sharp wave ripples which are implicated in memory function in adult wild type rats.  It is intriguing to note that the increase in ripple amplitude is not seen in adult male TgF344-AD rats which express human β-amyloid precursor protein (with the Swedish mutation) and human presenilin-1 (with a Δ exon 9 mutation).

See also 
 GABAA receptor negative allosteric modulator
 GABAA receptor § Ligands

References 

GABAA receptor negative allosteric modulators
Isoxazoles
Aromatic ethers
Phthalazines
Triazoles